was a Japanese economist.

Career
He received a B.S. in mathematics from the University of Tokyo and a D.Sc. in mathematics from the University of Tokyo in 1961.

honors
 1962, Fellow, Econometric Society.
 2000, Order of the Rising Sun, 3rd class.

Published works

Books

Journal articles

References

External links

1923 births
2001 deaths
20th-century Japanese  economists
General equilibrium theorists
University of Tokyo alumni
Academic staff of Tokyo University of Science
Academic staff of Hitotsubashi University
University of Minnesota faculty
University of California, Berkeley faculty
University of Southern California faculty
Academic staff of the University of Tsukuba
Academic staff of Osaka University
Academic staff of Tokyo International University
Recipients of the Order of the Rising Sun, 3rd class
Fellows of the Econometric Society
Presidents of the Japanese Economic Association